The Ceremonial mayor of Salford is the ceremonial leader of the City of Salford. The ceremonial mayor is appointed annually from the members of Salford City Council and serves for one municipal year.

History
The last borough reeve and first Mayor of Salford, 1844–1845, was William Lockett.

Mayors of Salford
 Source: http://www.salford.gov.uk/previousmayors.htm

1844–1845 William Lockett (first Mayor of Salford)
1845–1846 John Kay
1846–1847 Robert Livingstone
1847–1848 William Jenkinson
1848–1850 Edward Ryley Langworthy (two consecutive years), MP for Salford, 1857
1850–1851 Thomas Agnew
1851–1853 Frank Ashton (two consecutive years)
1853–1855 William Ross (two consecutive years)
1855–1857 Stephen Heelis (two consecutive years)
1857–1859 William Harvey (two consecutive years)
1859–1861 James Weston (two consecutive years)
1861–1862 James Worrall
1862–1864 William Pearson (two consecutive years)
1864–1866 Wright Turner (two consecutive years)
1866–1868 Henry Davis Pochin (two consecutive years)
1868–1871 Thomas Davies (three consecutive years)
1871–1873 Thomas Barlow (two consecutive years)
1873–1876 Richard Harwood (three consecutive years)
1876–1878 Francis Walmsley (two consecutive years)
1878–1881 William Robinson (three consecutive years)
1881–1883 Richard Husband (two consecutive years)
1883–1885 Charles Makinson (two consecutive years)
1885–1887 James Farmer (two consecutive years)
1887–1889 Albert Dickins (two consecutive years)
1889–1891 Benjamin Robinson (two consecutive years)
1891–1893 Peter Keevney (two consecutive years)
1893–1894 Sir William Bailey
1894–1897 Sir Richard Mottram (three consecutive years)
1897–1898 Richard Husband
1898–1898 Sir Richard Mottram
1898–1902 Samuel Rudman (four consecutive years)
1902–1905 Alderman Sir William Stephens (Liberal) (three consecutive years)
1905–1908 Isidor Frankenburg (three consecutive years)
1908–1909 Thomas Jenkins
1909–1910 Joseph Snape
1910–1911 Frank Phillips
1911–1912 Henry Linsley
1912–1913 William Ollier
1913–1914 Ernest Desquesnes
1914–1915 Alfred Worsley
1915–1916 Julius Hulton
1916–1917 James Higson
1917–1918 William Huddart
1918–1919 Edwin Mather
1919–1920 William Hughes
1920–1921 Frederick Hampson
1921–1922 George Barker
1922–1923 Walter Barrett
1923–1924 John McDougall
1924–1925 George Billington
1925–1926 Samuel Delves
1926–1927 John Rothwell
1927–1928 Abraham Williamson
1928–1929 Albert Collins
1929–1930 Samuel Finburgh
1930–1931 John Bloom
1931–1932 Joseph Jackson
1932–1933 Sir James Emery
1933–1934 Edward Hardy, MP for Salford South, 1945 and Salford East, 1950
1934–2000 See source
1943-1944 Cornelius J Townsend
2000–2001 Barry Warner
2001–2002 Jim King
2002–2003 Ben Wallsworth MM, MBE
2003–2004 Jimmy Hulmes
2004–2005 Stan Witkowski
2005–2006 Jimmy Hunt
2006–2007 Bernard Murphy
2007–2008 Valerie Burgoyne
2008–2009 Margaret Morris
2009–2010 Roger Lightup
2010–2011 George Wilson
2011–2012 Eric Burgoyne

Ceremonial mayors
2012–2013 Bernard Lea
2013–2014 Alan Clague
2014–2015 Christine Hudson
2015–2016 Peter Dobbs
2016–2017 Karen Garrido
2017–2018 Peter Connor
2018–2019 Ronnie Wilson
2019–2020 Charlie McIntyre

References

 
Salford
Greater Manchester-related lists